31 Pegasi is a single star in the northern constellation of Pegasus. It is visible to the naked eye as a dim, blue-white hued point of light with a baseline apparent visual magnitude of 4.99. It is located approximately 1,600 light years away from the Sun based on parallax, but is drifting closer with a radial velocity of −5.3 km/s.

This is a massive Be star with a stellar classification of B2IV-V. It is a γ Cas variable; a type of shell star with a circumstellar disc of gas surrounding the star at the equator, and ranges from 5.05 up to 4.85 in visual magnitude. The star is 15.4 million years old with 12.5 times the mass of the Sun. It is radiating around 28,000 times the luminosity of the Sun from its photosphere at an effective temperature of 23,890 K.

References

B-type subgiants
Be stars
Gamma Cassiopeiae variable stars

Pegasus (constellation)
BD+11 4784
Pegasi, 31
212076
110386
8520
Pegasi, IN